Barry O'Connell (born 1994) is an Irish hurler who plays for Limerick Premier Championship club Kildimo-Pallaskenry. He usually lines out as a right wing-forward. O'Connell is a former member of the Limerick senior hurling team.

Playing career

University

During his studies at the Limerick Institute of Technology, O'Connell was selected for the college's senior hurling team for the Fitzgibbon Cup.

Club

O'Connell joined the Kildimo-Pallaskenry club at a young age and played in all grades at juvenile and underage levels, before eventually joining the club's top adult team.

On 28 October 2017, O'Connell captained Kildimo-Pallaskenry to the Limerick Intermediate Championship title. He scored a point from right wing-forward in the 2-13 to 0-09 defeat of Glenroe in the final.

Inter-county

Minor and under-21

O'Connell first played for Limerick as a member of the minor team on 27 April 2011 in a 2-14 to 0-12 Munster Championship defeat of Cork. His two seasons with the minor team ended without success.

O'Connell subsequently joined the Limerick under-21 hurling team and won a Munster Championship medal in his first season after a 0-22 to 0-19 win over Clare in the final. On 12 September 2015, he was at centre-back when Limerick defeated Wexford by 0-26 to 1-07 in the All-Ireland final.

Intermediate

O'Connell played for the Limerick intermediate hurling team for the first time on 9 June 2013 in a 0-20 to 0-15 Munster Championship defeat by Tipperary. He also lined out during Limerick's unsuccessful championship campaign in 2015.

Senior

O'Connell joined the Limerick senior panel in January 2016. He made his first appearance for the team in a 1-19 to 0-14 National Hurling League defeat of Offaly on 6 March 2016.

O'Connell was included on the panel again in 2017, however, he was not included on Limerick's championship panel.

O'Connell rejoined the Limerick senior panel in 2018. On 19 August 2018, he was a member of the extended panel when Limerick won their first All-Ireland title in 45 years after a 3-16 to 2-18 defeat of Galway in the final.

O'Connell was a member of Limerick's extended panel once again during the 2019 National League, however, he made no appearance during Limerick's eight-game run to the title. He was dropped from the panel prior to the start of the Munster Championship.

Career statistics

Honours

Kildimo-Pallaskenry
Limerick Intermediate Hurling Championship (1): 2017 (c)

Limerick
All-Ireland Senior Hurling Championship (1): 2018
National Hurling League (1): 2019
All-Ireland Under-21 Hurling Championship (1): 2015
Munster Under-21 Hurling Championship (1): 2015

References

1994 births
Living people
Kildimo-Pallaskenry hurlers
Limerick inter-county hurlers
Alumni of Limerick Institute of Technology